South Keys station is a stop on Ottawa's transitway system. Operated by OC Transpo, it is last station at the southern end of the Transitway, just north of Hunt Club Road. The station is located in the South Keys neighbourhood of Ottawa at the south end of the South Keys Shopping Centre beside the Cineplex Odeon South Keys Cinemas, between Bank Street and the Airport Parkway. The station was opened to traffic with the southern transitway on September 2, 1995.

OC Transpo bus route 97 continues on the Airport Parkway from Greenboro to the most southern station, Airport station, while other routes such as routes 98 and 99 exit at Hunt Club Road.

Previously, City Council approved the addition of an O-Train station at South Keys (instead of Lester) in conjunction of the expansion of the north–south light rail line. The project was cancelled on December 14, 2006. In 2023, South Keys will reopen as a centre platform, light rail station. It will serve as the transfer point between the Trillium Line and the Airport Link.

Service

The following routes serve South Keys as of September 4, 2022:

 After the Airport Spur and the Trillium Line open to customers, route  will be retired and replaced by Line   which will connect riders to/from the Airport.
 School route  serves the intersection of Transitway and Hunt Club but not this station directly

Safety issues
This station has a history of safety concerns during the night time hours. There were several incidents involving assaults, swarming and vandalism in the vicinity which prompted some increased safety measures. This station has a night stop which all buses use after 9 PM.

References

Railway stations scheduled to open in 2023
Trillium Line stations
Line 4 (Ottawa) stations
1995 establishments in Ontario
Transitway (Ottawa) stations